Dr. Mekam is a 2018 Nollywood movie directed by Ike Nnaebue, co-produced by Oby Olebara Uzoukwu and Phil Erabie .

Plot
The story of a Doctor called Dr. Mekam returns home from abroad after service as a doctor. He came back to Nigeria in other to become a president but later realised that the path to take to become a president was not an easy one.

Cast
Cast list
 Uche Jombo
 Kalu Ikeagwu
 Seun Akindele
 Yemi Blaq
 Oby Olebara Uzoukwu
 Gloria Anozieyoung
 Chika Chukwu
 Emeka Okoye
 Eric Obinna
 Eva Appiah

References

English-language Nigerian films
2010s English-language films